Caliente station is a historic Mission Revival style railway station, located in Caliente, Nevada, United States. The station is listed on the National Register of Historic Places as the Caliente Railroad Depot, and is Nevada Historical Marker number 249.

History
The station was built by the Los Angeles and Salt Lake Railroad (later the Union Pacific Railroad) in 1923 to serve the railroad's division point on the mainline between Los Angeles, California, and Salt Lake City, Utah.

The depot is a two-story wood frame stucco building. The first floor held the passenger waiting room, station agent's office and other railroad offices. The second floor was used as a hotel.

The division point at Caliente served as a maintenance facility and was a base for helper locomotives. In the 1950s, as diesel locomotives replaced steam, the railroad no longer needed to use the Caliente site. Maintenance of the locomotives was moved to Las Vegas in 1948.

Until 1997, the station saw service on Amtrak's Desert Wind.

Present day
In 1970, the building was turned over to the city of Caliente. In order to preserve the depot structure, the city moved its municipal services into the building. The station is now the Caliente city hall, library, and art gallery.

See also

 National Register of Historic Places listings in Lincoln County, Nevada
 William A. Clark
 Kelso Depot, Restaurant and Employees Hotel

References

External links

Former Union Pacific Railroad stations
Railway hotels in the United States
Former Amtrak stations in Nevada
Los Angeles and Salt Lake Railroad
Railway stations in the United States opened in 1923
Nevada historical markers
Railway stations on the National Register of Historic Places in Nevada
Railway freight houses on the National Register of Historic Places
Tourist attractions in Lincoln County, Nevada
John and Donald Parkinson buildings
Mission Revival architecture in Nevada
National Register of Historic Places in Lincoln County, Nevada
Railway buildings and structures on the National Register of Historic Places in Nevada
1923 establishments in Nevada
Railway stations closed in 1993
Repurposed railway stations in the United States